MJK may refer to:
Maynard James Keenan (born 1964), American rock singer
Marinejegerkommandoen, Norwegian maritime special operation forces unit
Shark Bay Airport, IATA airport code "MJK"